Pellerin is a name of French origin. The name may refer to:

People with the surname
Fleur Pellerin (born 1973), French politician
Giles Pellerin (1906–1998), American college football fan; notable for having attended 797 consecutive USC football games over a period of 73 years
Guy Pellerin (born 1971), Canadian hockey referee
Joseph Pellerin (1684–1782), French Intendant-General of the Navy, first Commissioner of the Navy
Krystin Pellerin (born 1983), Canadian stage and film actress
Scott Pellerin (born 1970), Canadian ice hockey player

Places
Le Pellerin, France
Saint-Pellerin, Eure-et-Loir, France
Saint-Pellerin, Manche, France